Pennithera manifesta is a species of moth of the  family Noctuidae. It is found in Taiwan.

References

Moths described in 1986
Herminiinae